Richard Joseph "Dick" Audet  (13 March 1922 – 3 March 1945) was a Canadian fighter pilot ace during World War II. In his first contact with enemy aircraft on 29 December 1944 he destroyed five planes. By the end of January 1945 he had claimed a further five victories and shared a sixth. He was killed in action on 3 March 1945 near Coesfeld, Germany.

Childhood
Audet was born on 13 March 1922 in Lethbridge, Alberta, the youngest and sixth child of Paul and Edewisca Audet who were both born in Quebec. He grew up on the family ranch, in the Milk River valley, about two miles east of "Writing-on-Stone Provincial Park". With the exception of one year at Milk River Valley School he received all of his education to grade twelve in Coutts, Alberta. He was an outstanding athlete and loved all sports including hockey, basketball, and baseball. He was offered a position in Lethbridge to instruct and coach these sports, but he made up his mind to become a pilot. Too young to enlist, he attended business college in Lethbridge in 1940–41, then worked as a stenographer and bookkeeper at the air force base at High River.

Airforce career
Audet enlisted for service in the Royal Canadian Air Force (RCAF) on 7 August 1941 and received his pilot's wings in October 1942. He was then posted to the UK where he received five months of advanced operational training followed by non-fighter operations. During this time he met and married Iris Gibbins from Northampton.

On 20 September 1944, he was transferred to a RCAF Spitfire Unit, 411 Squadron. Later that year on 29 December, piloting a Spitfire IXe he destroyed two Bf 109s and three Fw 190s in five to seven minutes over Osnabrück. This action earned him a promotion to Flight Lieutenant and he was awarded the Distinguished Flying Cross (DFC).

On 3 March 1945, Flight Lieutenant Audet was strafing a German train west of Münster. The train returned fire and Audet's Spitfire crashed to the ground. There is some uncertainty as to whether he died in the crash or was captured, but his body was never recovered.

Audet had flown more than 50 combat sorties and added a bar to his DFC. In addition he was awarded the 1939-45 Star, Air Crew Europe Star with Clasp, France and Germany Star, Defence Medal, War Medal 1939–1945 and Canadian Volunteer Service Medal with Clasp.

Memorials
Flight Lieutenant Richard Joseph Audet has no known grave and his name is recorded on panel 278 of the Air Forces Memorial, or Runnymede Memorial, in England. and the Lethbridge cenotaph. His mother and wife both received a Memorial Cross in his honour.

Further reading
 Respect Calls for Thoroughness - Digging Into the Story of Flt/Lt “Dick” Audet, Joop T. Thuring. 
 Dick Audet at acesofww2.com

References

Canadian World War II pilots
Canadian World War II flying aces
1922 births
1945 deaths
Recipients of the Distinguished Flying Cross (United Kingdom)
People from Lethbridge
Canadian military personnel killed in World War II
Aviators killed by being shot down
Royal Canadian Air Force officers
Royal Canadian Air Force personnel of World War II
Canadian military personnel from Alberta